Roosevelt University is a private university with campuses in Chicago and Schaumburg, Illinois. Founded in 1945, the university was named in honor of United States President Franklin Delano Roosevelt and First Lady  Eleanor Roosevelt.

The university enrolls around 6,000 students between its undergraduate and graduate programs. Roosevelt is also home to the Chicago College of Performing Arts. The university's newest academic building, Wabash, is located in The Loop of Downtown Chicago. It is the tallest educational building in Chicago, the second tallest educational building in the United States, and the fourth-largest academic complex in the world.

History 

The university was founded in 1945 by Edward J. Sparling, the former president of Central YMCA College in Chicago. He refused to provide Central YMCA College's board with the demographic data of the student body, fearing the board would develop a quota system to limit the number of African Americans, Jews, immigrants, and women at the school. Sparling resigned under protest and took with him many faculty and students to start a new college. Faculty voted in favor 62 to 1, and students 488 to 2 for the school. In the beginning, the university had no library, campus, or endowment.

The new college was chartered as Thomas Jefferson College on March 28, 1945 and had financial backing from Marshall Field III, the Julius Rosenwald Foundation, the International Ladies' Garment Workers Union, and numerous other individuals and organizations. Two weeks later, President Franklin D. Roosevelt died. The college obtained his widow Eleanor's permission to rename the institution as Roosevelt College in his memory.

In 1947, the college purchased the Auditorium Building for one dollar, and it became the permanent home. The college was rededicated to both Franklin and Eleanor in 1959. Early advisory board members included Marian Anderson, Pearl Buck, Ralph Bunche, Albert Einstein, Thomas Mann, Gunnar Myrdal, Draper Daniels, and Albert Schweitzer. In August 1996, the university opened its Albert A. Robin Campus in Schaumburg, after a donation from Albert A. Robin, an entrepreneur and immigrant.

On March 9, 2020, Robert Morris University Illinois merged with Roosevelt University. The integrated university continued under the name of Roosevelt University. Robert Morris added its majors to Roosevelt’s large portfolio of undergraduate and graduate programs under the name Robert Morris Experiential College, one of several colleges of Roosevelt University.

Campus

Downtown Chicago campus 

Chicago classes are held within Roosevelt's historic Auditorium Building at 430 S. Michigan Avenue, blocks from the Magnificent Mile.  The Auditorium Building houses the Auditorium Theatre of Roosevelt University and numerous administrative offices for the university. Pro football's 2015 NFL Draft was held in the Auditorium on April 30, 2015, the league's first time hosting the draft in Chicago in more than 50 years.

In Spring 2010, construction began on a new building for the downtown campus, which was completed in Spring 2012. The 32-story vertical campus, the Wabash Building, is the second-tallest higher-education building in the United States and the sixth tallest in the world. It serves as a multipurpose building: housing student services, classrooms, contemporary science labs, administrative offices, and student residences. Student residences are on the top floors (14-32), with a shared lounge overlooking Lake Michigan on each floor. The university held an open house in the summer of 2012, with classes beginning in the new addition during the fall 2012 semester. The Lillian and Larry Goodman Center, the first stand-alone facility for college athletics in Chicago's Loop, is the latest addition to Roosevelt University's downtown Chicago campus and serves as the home for Roosevelt Lakers athletics.

Albert A. Robin Campus, Schaumburg 

Roosevelt University's campus in Schaumburg is the largest four-year university in Chicago's Northwest suburbs, serving approximately 2,500 students.  The campus is located in the former headquarters office building of the Pure Oil Company. Roosevelt converted the building into a comprehensive campus in 1996.  The Albert A. Robin Campus is home to the Doctor of Pharmacy program, which accepted its inaugural class in July 2011. Roosevelt's PharmD program is the Midwest's first three-year, year-round program of its kind. In July 2014, it achieved full accreditation for its Doctor of Pharmacy curriculum.

Located on 30 acres, the Schaumburg Campus is on the north side of Golf Road Illinois Route 58 across from the Woodfield Mall and near the intersection with Meacham Road. Recently, campus administrators have created prairies on sections of the land for environmental and educational purposes.

Academics
The university offers undergraduate and graduate degrees through six colleges: 
Chicago College of Performing Arts (Music Conservatory), Chicago College of Performing Arts (Theatre Conservatory), College of Arts & Sciences, College of Education, College of Pharmacy, and the Heller College of Business. In addition, the university operates a variety of centers and institutes: St. Clair Drake Center For African And African-American Studies, The Mansfield Institute for Social Justice and Transformation, Roosevelt University Cyber Security Center, The Center for New Deal Studies, Policy Research Collaborative, The Montesquieu Forum, The Marshall Bennett Institute of Real Estate, The Institute for Politics, and The Institute of Tourism Studies

Social justice, a cornerstone of Roosevelt's history and development, has been purposefully embedded into the school's curriculum and is part of every student's academic experience. Topics previously covered have included such issues as public versus private rights to use city parks, the impact of gentrification following urban modernization projects, and the impact one can have to preserve the earth's natural resources. Student-led research projects and theses have also touched areas such as gender equality and the effects of minimum wage on the economy.

Student life and residence life 
Roosevelt University currently has three residence hall options, including the new vertical campus. The new Wabash building serves as housing for all incoming freshmen and transfers. The University Center of Chicago is the other main residence hall, with apartment style options. It was officially opened in the fall of 2004 and is located at 525 S. State Street. The UCC houses students from Roosevelt University, DePaul University, and Columbia College Chicago, totaling 1700 residents from these three schools combined. The second residence hall is Fornelli Hall, with apartment-only options, located in the Pittsfield Building at 55 E. Washington Street, Chicago. It opened in the fall of 2008. It provides apartment-style housing for upperclassmen from Roosevelt University.

The Herman Crown Center, located at 425 S. Wabash Avenue, Chicago, was the main residence hall for Roosevelt until it was closed in the spring of 2008.  Like the Herman Crown Center, the new 32-story vertical campus is connected to the Auditorium Building and provides direct access between the two buildings.

Student activities 

There are many active student organizations at both of the Roosevelt University campuses. 
 Alpha Gamma Delta Women's Fraternity: an international fraternity and a member of the National Panhellenic Conference; was installed at Roosevelt in 2008 and was the 182nd chapter
 Alpha Phi Omega: co-ed National Service Fraternity; charter for the Alpha Phi Omega chapter was originally at Central YMCA, transferred on reactivation at Roosevelt
Sigma Alpha Iota: International Music Women's Fraternity. Mu Xi chapter at Chicago College of Performing Arts initiated April 2015.
 Oyez Review: Roosevelt's national and award-winning literary journal.
 Black Student Union: represents the interests and concerns of black students, faculty and administration at Roosevelt University, and brings together all aspects of black student life for the purpose of improving the campus environment
 Colleges Against Cancer: an initiative originally started by the American Cancer Society and brought to Roosevelt to educate advocacy, recognize survivors, and participate in the Relay for Life.
 Mansfield Institute Student Organization (MISO)
 RU Green: develops sustainable practices and systems throughout campus to promote an ecologically conscious student body and to implement green methodologies throughout campus
 PULSE: GSM (Gender and Sexual Minority) Society: an organization that focuses on uniting students who are accepting of differences; an alliance among all gender and sexual minorities. Was renamed in 2016 after the PULSE massacre in Florida. 
 RU Sociological Society (RUSS): fosters the advancement of sociological study at undergraduate and graduate levels by providing outlets for students to present research, exchange ideas, and build relationships
 Society for Human Resource Management: a gateway into the human resources profession by encouraging personal and career growth for its student members
 Student Government Association
 Students for Sensible Drug Policy
 The Torch: Roosevelt's student newspaper (7,500/weekly); noted for first publishing Shel Silverstein
 WRBC The Blaze: Roosevelt's online student radio station

Athletics 

The Roosevelt athletic teams are called the Lakers. The university is a member of the National Association of Intercollegiate Athletics (NAIA), primarily competing in the Chicagoland Collegiate Athletic Conference (CCAC) since the 2010–11 academic year (when the school revived its athletics program and joined the NAIA).

Roosevelt competes in 25 intercollegiate varsity sports: Men's sports include baseball, basketball, bowling, cross country, football, golf, ice hockey (D-I & D-II), soccer, tennis, track & field and volleyball; while women's sports include basketball, bowling, cross country, ice hockey, soccer, softball, tennis, track & field and volleyball; and co-ed sports include cheerleading, dance, eSports performing arts.

Move to NCAA Division II
On August 1, 2022, Roosevelt announced that it will moved to the Division II ranks of the National Collegiate Athletic Association (NCAA) and to join the Great Lakes Intercollegiate Athletic Conference (GLIAC), starting in the 2023–24 school year as a provisional member, before competing in full GLIAC membership in 2024–25.

Athletic expansion
The Lakers announced in April 2020 their addition of football and men's/women's ice hockey for the 2020–21 academic year, having been acquired from Robert Morris when they competed as the Eagles. The ice hockey teams joined the American Collegiate Hockey Association (ACHA) and inherited the Eagles' former ACHA affiliation.

The 20,000-capacity SeatGeek Stadium is the home of the Roosevelt Lakers soccer teams. Roosevelt University revived its athletic program after a 20-year absence in 2010. Roosevelt added women's volleyball for the 2011–12 academic year, followed by men's golf, men's and women's soccer, and softball for the 2012–13 academic year. The expansion of the university's athletics has brought the number of sport offerings from the initial seven sports to fourteen. After the 2020 merger, Roosevelt completed its acquisition of Robert Morris's football and men's/women's ice hockey teams.

The Lillian and Larry Goodman Center is located at 501 S. Wabash Avenue, which is the southeast corner of the intersection known as Ida B. Wells Drive and Wabash Avenue. The Goodman Center is a two-story, 27,834-gross-square-foot field house featuring a multi-purpose gymnasium on the second floor and first-floor space containing offices, meeting rooms, a team lounge, locker rooms, an athletic training room, and a strength and conditioning center.

In popular culture

The lobby stairwell of the Auditorium Building (430 S. Michigan Avenue) was featured in the film The Untouchables (1987). The lobby was also the set of a nightclub scene in the 2009 film Public Enemies.
In the summer of 2005, the Murray-Green Library on the 10th floor of the Auditorium Building was used as a set for the film The Lake House, in which the room doubled as an architect's office.

Notable people

The university's alumni include many entertainers, academics, and politicians such as Robert Lamm, Anthony Braxton, Jacques Paul Klein, Danitra Vance, and Harold Washington, while its first advisory board lists figures such as Eleanor Roosevelt and Albert Einstein.

References

External links 

 
 Official athletics website

 
1945 establishments in Illinois
Educational institutions established in 1945
Organizations based in Schaumburg, Illinois
Pharmacy schools in Illinois
Private universities and colleges in Illinois
Universities and colleges in Chicago
Universities and colleges in Cook County, Illinois